This is a list of winners and nominees of the Golden Horse Award for Best New Director.

Winners and nominees

2010s

2020s

References

External links 
 Official website 
 Official website 

Golden Horse Film Awards
Directorial debut film awards